Sorkheh Dizeh (also Romanized as Sorkheh Dīzeh; also known as Mīān Tāk, Sorkh Dīzeh, Sorkheh Dīz, Sūrkha Dīz, and Sūrkhedīzeh) is a village in Howmeh-ye Kerend Rural District, in the Central District of Dalahu County, Kermanshah Province, Iran. At the 2006 census, its population was 300, in 66 families.

References 

Populated places in Dalahu County